This is a list of National Basketball Association players by total career playoff games played.

Statistics accurate as of the 2022 NBA playoffs.

See also 

List of National Basketball Association career games played leaders

References

External links 
NBA & ABA Career Playoff Leaders and Records for Games at Basketball-Reference.com

National Basketball Association lists
National Basketball Association statistical leaders